The Uzbekistan national U-17 football team represents Uzbekistan in international U-17 football competitions. It is controlled by the Uzbekistan Football Association and is a member of the Asian Football Confederation.

Competitions

AFC U-16 Championship

Red border indicates Uzbekistan have hosted the Championship.

FIFA U-17 World Cup

Managers

 Aleksey Evstafeev, U15- U17 (2009-2011)
 Dilshod Nuraliev, U15- U17 (2011-2013)
 Timur Alimkhodjaev, U15- U16 (2013-2014)
 Alexander Mochinov, U16 (2014)
 Timur Alimkhodjaev, U15- U16 (2015-2016)
 Dilshod Nuraliev, U15 (2017)
 Azamat Abduraimov, U14- U16 (2018-2020)
 Olim Shokirov, U16- (2020-)

Current coaching staff 
As of September 2020

Current squads

U-17

U-16

U-15

Previous squads

FIFA U-17 World Cup/Youth Championship squads
2013 FIFA U-17 World Cup squads – Uzbekistan
2011 FIFA U-17 World Cup squads – Uzbekistan

AFC U-16 Championship squads
2016 AFC U-16 Championship squads - Uzbekistan
2014 AFC U-16 Championship squads - Uzbekistan
2010 AFC U-16 Championship squads – Uzbekistan
2008 AFC U-16 Championship squads – Uzbekistan

Recent results and friendlies

U-16 Fixtures

U-17 Fixtures

See also
Uzbekistan national under-20 football team
Uzbekistan national under-23 football team
Uzbekistan national football team

References

External links
Uzbekistan Football Federation
FIFA Profile: Uzbekistan U-17

u17
Asian national under-17 association football teams